Tsoutsouvas is a surname. Notable people with the surname include: 

Lou Tsoutsouvas (1915–2001), American football player and coach
Sam Tsoutsouvas, American actor and lyricist
Sam Tsoutsouvas (1917–1989), American football player